Roule-toi par terre is the name of the second album by francophone Quebecer comedy duo Crampe en masse.

Track listing

1999 albums
Crampe en masse albums
1990s comedy albums